K. S. Eshwarappa (born 10 June 1948) is an Indian senior Bharatiya Janata Party politician who was Minister of Rural Development and Panchayat Raj of Karnataka from 20 August 2019 to 14 April 2022. He was the 6th Deputy Chief Minister of Karnataka from 12 July 2012 to 12 May 2013. He was Minister of State for Rural development and Panchayat Raj of Karnataka from 20 August 2019 to 26 July 2021. He is a senior leader of the Bharatiya Janata Party in Karnataka. He was the seventh Deputy Chief minister in the BJP government headed by Jagadish Shettar from 2012 to 2013. On 20 August 2019 he was inducted as a Cabinet Minister in the BJP government led by B.S. Yediyurappa. He served as Leader of the Opposition in the Karnataka Legislative Council (2014-2018).

Early life 
K. S. Eshwarappa was born in Bellary. His father Sharanappa and mother Bassamma moved to Shimoga in the early 1950s. His parents worked in the Bhoopalam Areca Mandi as daily wage workers. When young Eshwarappa also tried to go to work with his parents, his mother opposed the move and urged him to concentrate on his education and earn a good name in society. This inspiration that he got in his childhood, eventually led him to become a social worker.

As a child, Eshwarappa was interested in sports and music. One of his classmates was D. M. Ravindra who later became the Prant Pracharak of Rashtriya Swayamsevak Sangh (R.S.S.). Narasimha Murthy Iyengar, a well-known V.H.P leader in Shimoga, introduced him to the RSS during his childhood. Thus, his public life began as an activist of the RSS.

While he was a student in the National Commerce College, Shimoga, he actively worked with the Akhil Bharatiya Vidyarthi Parishad (A.B.V.P.), the student wing of RSS. After his graduation, he started his own private business in Shimoga city. He also involved himself with the erstwhile Bharatiya Jana Sangh.

Political career  
During Emergency (1975–77), he was arrested and detained in the Bellary Jail. After the removal of emergency, he became very active in politics. He worked in different capacities and in 1982, became the president of the Shimoga city unit of BJP. His personal efforts were one of the main reasons in M. Ananda Rao winning from Shimoga as the first ever BJP candidate.

In 1989, he contested the Karnataka assembly elections as a BJP candidate from Shimoga and defeated a heavyweight, the then health Minister K. H. Srinivas by a margin of 1,304 votes. He became popular with this victory and went on to win four more times from this constituency, losing only once in 1999. In 1992, he became the President of the State unit of BJP and was instrumental in his party's good performance in the 1994 state assembly elections. In 2000, he was appointed the Chairman of the Central Silk Board when the NDA government was in power.

In the BJP-JDS coalition Government headed by H. D. Kumaraswamy, he was Minister for Water Resources. Following the historic victory of the BJP in the Karnataka state elections in 2008, he became the minister for Power in the B.S. Yeddyurappa government.

In January 2010, he resigned as minister and was unanimously elected as the President of the Karnataka state unit of the ruling BJP. This move was seen as BJP's strategy to tackle opposition leader in the assembly Siddaramaiah, who also belongs to the same community.

In July 2012, following the resignation of D.V. Sadananda Gowda, Jagadish Shettar was appointed the Chief minister and Eshwarappa became Deputy Chief minister. He was also entrusted with the Revenue and Rural development portfolios. He then stepped down as the State BJP president and was succeeded by Prahlad Joshi.

In the 2013 Assembly elections, Eshwarappa contested again from the Shimoga assembly constituency and lost to K. B. Prasanna Kumar of the Congress by a margin of nearly 6,000 votes. Days after making an alleged “hate speech” against a minority community, Eshwarappa was slapped with a criminal case in April 2013 after electoral officials issued directions for it.

However, he was nominated by his party to the Karnataka Legislative Council in 2014 and became the Leader of the Opposition in the council.

In the 2018 Karnataka Legislative Assembly election he again contested from Shimaga and won the seat. Further after the collapse of H. D. Kumaraswamy's coalition government, he was sworn in as the Rural development and Panchayat Raj minister. After the resignation of B. S. Yediyurappa he was again inducted as the cabinet  minister under Basavaraj Bommai.

On 14 April 2022, Eshwarappa resigned from his position as Rural Development and Panchayat Raj minister after a controversy arose over his alleged role in the suicide of a contractor, Santhosh Patil, who wasn't paid for road works.

Controversies

Santhosh Patil, a contractor involved in government projects,accused Eshwarappa of harassing him for commission, was found dead in a hotel in the state’s Udupi district on morning of April 12, 2022.

Patil who had recently raised allegations against the then rural development minister K S Eshwarappa, saying that the BJP leader had been harassing him for commissions to clear the bills for contracts he had implemented for the government over a year ago. Patil had also said that Eshwarappa should be held responsible if something happened to him.

On April 12, Karnataka Chief Minister Basavaraj Bommai was informed in Mangaluru that the contractor had gone missing after leaving a note behind.
Patil, who identified himself as the national secretary of a right-wing group called Hindu Vahini, had recently written to Prime Minister Narendra Modi and Union minister for rural development Giriraj Singh alleging that Eshwarappa and his associates were harassing him for commissions. Eshwarappa claimed that he did not know Patil.

Patil, in his letters to the central government, had stated that he and six other contractors had implemented road projects in Hindala gram panchayat in Belagavi district in May 2021, but were not paid for the same. He claimed that the contractors invested Rs 4 crore for the project, but had suffered losses due to government delay in payments.

Alleging that government officials were seeking a 40 per cent commission on the total bill, Patil claimed to have approached top BJP leaders with his grievances. “I am in great tension and have huge pressure from creditors who have given me finance on interest. If the payment and work order is not given immediately, then I do not have any option for myself,” he had said in a March 11 letter to the Union minister.

Hate Speech
 Eshwarappa made a controversial remark at an event in Gundlupet, claiming that masjids were built in Mathura and Kashi after demolishing temples.

He also said Narendra Modi will become the Prime Minister again in 2024, and those masjids will also be destroyed on the lines of the Babri Masjid in Ayodhya and temples will be rebuilt there too.
 Former Karnataka minister K S Eshwarappa has triggered a row after he asked whether Allah was deaf if Muslims had to recite his name through the microphone every day.
During his speech at the BJP’s ongoing Vijay Sankalpa Yatra on March 12, azaan – the Islamic call for prayer – was heard in the background. On hearing it, the Shivamogga MLA said the azaan was a headache for him wherever he went. “There is a Supreme Court judge. Today or tomorrow, this (practice of calling azaan over mics) will definitely end,” Eshwarappa said, attracting cheers from party supporters at the rally.

References 

People from Shimoga
People from Bellary
1948 births
Living people
Karnataka MLAs 2018–2023
State cabinet ministers of Karnataka
Bharatiya Janata Party politicians from Karnataka
Indians imprisoned during the Emergency (India)
Leaders of the Opposition in the Karnataka Legislative Council
Deputy Chief Ministers of Karnataka
Karnataka MLAs 2004–2007
Karnataka MLAs 2008–2013
Karnataka MLCs 2014–2020